Melissa Fitzgerald is an American actress and the Senior Director of the nonprofit organization Justice For Vets. She is best known for portraying Carol Fitzpatrick on The West Wing.

Early life and education
Fitzgerald's father is Pennsylvania judge James Fitzgerald; her mother, Carole, is involved in politics and volunteer work in Philadelphia.

Fitzgerald graduated from Springside School in Philadelphia, Pennsylvania, and earned a B.A. in Drama and Literature from the University of Pennsylvania. Fitzgerald studied acting at The Neighborhood Playhouse School of the Theatre in New York City.

Career
Fitzgerald is the founder of Voices in Harmony, a non-profit community theater in Los Angeles. From 1999 to 2006, she played Carol Fitzpatrick, assistant to press secretary C.J. Cregg, on The West Wing.

On January 19, 2007, Nicholas D. Kristof of The New York Times announced that Fitzgerald had won a writing contest he had sponsored on Darfur.

On May 17, 2008, Fitzgerald received the Chestnut Hill College Medal, and she was the commencement speaker.

In November 2013, Fitzgerald joined Justice For Vets as its Senior Director. The organization advocates for veterans treatment courts.

Filmography

Movies
Love & Sex
Frequency
Monument Avenue
The Truman Show
Boxing Helena
The Date
The Painter 
’’Country Remedy’’

Television
The West Wing
Grey's Anatomy

References

External links
 
 Justice for Vets profile

American television actresses
American film actresses
Living people
Actresses from Philadelphia
University of Pennsylvania alumni
20th-century American actresses
21st-century American actresses
Year of birth missing (living people)